Richard Woodville may refer to:

 Richard Woodville, 1st Earl Rivers (1405–1469), English nobleman, father of Elizabeth Woodville, wife of Edward IV
 Richard Woodville, 3rd Earl Rivers (1453–1491), son of the above, brother of Elizabeth Woodville
 Richard Woodville (died 1441), father-in-law of William Haute (MP), Captain of Calais and High Sheriff of Kent
 Richard Caton Woodville (1825–1855), American artist
 Richard Caton Woodville Jr. (1856–1927), English artist and illustrator